Novomusino (Yañı Musa) is a rural locality (a selo) in Novotroitsky Selsoviet, Chishminsky District, Bashkortostan, Russia. The population was 222 as of 2010. There are 2 streets.

Geography 
Novomusino is located 24 km southeast of Chishmy (the district's administrative centre) by road. Novotroitskoye is the nearest rural locality.

References 

Rural localities in Chishminsky District